Cambodia Airways Co., Ltd., operating as Cambodia Airways is a full-service airline based in Phnom Penh of Cambodia.  The company slogan is The Wings of Cambodia.

History
By the end of August 2019, Cambodia Airways serves eight routes from its hub in Phnom Penh to Siem Reap and Sihanoukville for domestic flights, and for the international ones are to Macau, Taipei and Taichung (both in Taiwan for charter flights), Bangkok (Suvarnabhumi Airport), and Fuzhou (Mainland China).

Destinations
Cambodia Airways serves the following destinations:

Fleet
As of March 2023, the Cambodia Airways fleet consists of the following aircraft:

References 

Airlines of Cambodia
Cambodian companies established in 2017
Airlines established in 2017